The 2002 AFC Youth Championship was the 32nd edition of the AFC U-19 Championship, the biennial international youth football championship organised by the Asian Football Confederation (AFC) for the men's under-19 national teams of Asia. The tournament took place in Qatar, between 15 to 31 October 2002. A total of 12 teams played in the tournament which included Uzbekistan who was competing in their first AFC tournament.

The 12 teams were separated into three groups of four teams with the top two teams and the best two of the third place teams qualifying through to the knockout-stage with the winners of the quarter-finals qualifying through to the 2003 FIFA World Youth Championship in United Arab Emirates. After they finished top of Group A with seven points, South Korea would go on to claim their tenth continental youth title with a 1–0 win over Japan. Saudi Arabia and Uzbekistan also qualified for the 2003 World Youth Championship after they made it to the semi-finals defeating Syria and China in the quarter-finals.

Qualification competition

40 teams entered qualifying for the 2002 edition of the youth championship with the qualifying phase being played from the 13 March to 23 July 2002 with the teams being separated into the east and west zone. Before the draw was announced, Afghanistan withdrew with Lebanon and North Korea withdrawing after the draw was announced which meant that their groups only had three teams competing.

The first qualifying match was played on the 13 March in Group 11 when Singapore took on Myanmar in Singapore with Myanmar winning the match 1-0. Four teams who competed in the previous edition didn't qualify for the 2002 edition with them being replaced by Syria, Saudi Arabia, Bangladesh and India. With the tournament expanding to 12 teams for the 2002 edition, Vietnam made their first appearance in the Asian competition since 1974 while Uzbekistan was making their debut in the tournament after finishing top of their group ahead of Turkmenistan and Nepal.

Group stage

Group A

October 15

October 18

October 21

Group B

October 16

October 19

October 22

Group C

October 17

October 20

October 23

Third-placed qualifiers
At the end of the first stage, a comparison was made between the third placed teams of each group. The two best third-placed teams advanced to the quarter-finals.

UAE (best third-place) and India (second best third-place) qualified for the quarter-finals.

Knockout stages

Bracket

Quarter-finals

Semi finals

Third-place match

Final

Winners

Qualified teams for the 2003 FIFA World Youth Championship

The following four teams from AFC qualified for the 2003 FIFA World Youth Championship.

1 Bold indicates champions for that year. Italic indicates hosts for that year.

References

2002
2002
Youth
2002–03 in Qatari football
2002 in youth association football